In seven-dimensional geometry, a runcic 7-cube is a convex uniform 7-polytope, related to the uniform 7-demicube. There are 2 unique forms.

Runcic 7-cube

A runcic 7-cube, h3{4,35}, has half the vertices of a runcinated 7-cube, t0,3{4,35}.

Alternate names
 Small rhombated hemihepteract (Acronym sirhesa) (Jonathan Bowers)

Cartesian coordinates
The Cartesian coordinates for the vertices of a cantellated demihepteract centered at the origin are coordinate permutations:
 (±1,±1,±1,±3,±3,±3,±3)
with an odd number of plus signs.

Images

Runcicantic 7-cube

A runcicantic 7-cube, h2,3{4,35}, has half the vertices of a runcicantellated 7-cube, t0,1,3{4,35}.

Alternate names
 Great rhombated hemihepteract (Acronym girhesa) (Jonathan Bowers)

Cartesian coordinates
The Cartesian coordinates for the vertices of a runcicantic 7-cube centered at the origin are coordinate permutations:
 (±1,±1,±1,±1,±3,±5,±5)
with an odd number of plus signs.

Images

Related polytopes
This polytope is based on the 7-demicube, a part of a dimensional family of uniform polytopes called demihypercubes for being alternation of the hypercube family.

There are 95 uniform polytopes with D7 symmetry, 63 are shared by the BC6 symmetry, and 32 are unique:

Notes

References
 H.S.M. Coxeter:
 H.S.M. Coxeter, Regular Polytopes, 3rd Edition, Dover New York, 1973
 Kaleidoscopes: Selected Writings of H.S.M. Coxeter, edited by F. Arthur Sherk, Peter McMullen, Anthony C. Thompson, Asia Ivic Weiss, Wiley-Interscience Publication, 1995,  
 (Paper 22) H.S.M. Coxeter, Regular and Semi Regular Polytopes I, [Math. Zeit. 46 (1940) 380-407, MR 2,10]
 (Paper 23) H.S.M. Coxeter, Regular and Semi-Regular Polytopes II, [Math. Zeit. 188 (1985) 559-591]
 (Paper 24) H.S.M. Coxeter, Regular and Semi-Regular Polytopes III, [Math. Zeit. 200 (1988) 3-45]
 Norman Johnson Uniform Polytopes, Manuscript (1991)
 N.W. Johnson: The Theory of Uniform Polytopes and Honeycombs, Ph.D.
  x3o3o *b3x3o3o3o - sirhesa, x3x3o *b3x3o3o3o - girhesa

External links
 
 Polytopes of Various Dimensions
 Multi-dimensional Glossary

7-polytopes